Beisiegel is a German surname. Notable people with the surname include:

Isabelle Beisiegel (born 1979), Canadian golfer
Ludwig Beisiegel (born 1912), German field hockey player
Ulrike Beisiegel (born 1952), German biochemist
Walter Beisiegel (1907-1973), English Royal Air Force officer and cricketer

German-language surnames